The Netherlands first sent athletes to the Olympic Games in 1900, and has participated in almost all Games since then with the exception of 1904 Summer Olympics in St. Louis. The Netherlands boycotted the 1956 Summer Olympics in Melbourne as a protest against the Soviet invasion in Hungary just a few weeks before the beginning of the Games (One Dutch rider competed in the 1956 equestrian events, held in Stockholm a few months before the rest of the Games).

The first individual gold medal at the Summer Games was earned by Maurice Peeters in cycling at the 1920 Summer Olympics, in the men's 1000 metres sprint event. The first gold medal at the Winter Games was earned by Sjoukje Dijkstra in ladies' figure skating at the 1964 Winter Olympics.

The Netherlands hosted the 1928 Summer Olympics in Amsterdam. The Netherlands had expressed interest in hosting the 2028 Summer Olympics in either Amsterdam or Rotterdam, as a centennial celebration of the 1928 Games. Eventually, no bid came from either city and the Olympics were awarded to Los Angeles.

Prior to the 1992 Olympics, the country name was "Holland" with the country code of "HOL". From 1992 onward, they have utilized the "Netherlands" and "NED", as an abbreviation of the Dutch name Nederland.

Dutch athletes have won 322 medals at the Summer Olympic Games, with swimming and cycling as the top medal-producing sports. The nation has won another 130 medals at the Winter Olympic Games, of which 121 have come from speed skating.

Following the dissolution of the Netherlands Antilles in 2010 (which was a constituent country of the Kingdom of the Netherlands), the Netherlands Antilles Olympic Committee (NAOC) lost its Olympic license in July 2011. After the 2012 Olympic Games in London, athletes from the Netherlands Antilles can choose to participate for the Netherlands or Aruba, which has a semi-independent status within the Kingdom of the Netherlands. At the 2012 Games, athletes from the Netherlands Antilles participated in a unified Olympic team under the IOC flag. However, some athletes had already expressed their wish to represent either the Netherlands or Aruba in London.

Hosted Games 
The Netherlands has hosted the Games on one occasion.

Overview of Olympic participation

Timeline of participation 

The Netherlands Antilles participated at the Olympic Games from 1952 until 2008 as a constituent country of the Kingdom of the Netherlands. The National Olympic Committee for the Netherlands Antilles was created in 1931 and recognized by the International Olympic Committee from 1950 until 2011 upon the dissolution of the Netherlands Antilles.

Aruba left the Netherlands Antilles in 1986 to become a constituent country within the Kingdom of the Netherlands. Between 1952 until 1984, Aruban athletes competed as part of the Netherlands Antilles. Since the Olympic Games in 1988, athletes from Aruba have competed separately under their own Olympic banner and has participated in each Summer Olympic Games since then.

After the dissolution of the Netherlands Antilles in 2010, Bonaire, Sint Eustatius and Saba became part of the Netherlands as special municipalities of the Netherlands. Curaçao and Sint Maarten became separate constituent countries of the Kingdom of the Netherlands. At the 2012 Olympics, participants from the five islands competed as independent athletes under the Olympic flag. However, athletes from the former Netherlands Antilles who qualified for the 2012 Olympics were allowed to participate independently under the Olympic flag, in addition to the possibility of competing for the Netherlands (as for example Churandy Martina did) or Aruba (because they have Dutch nationality). Ultimately, three athletes from the Netherlands Antilles participated as Independent Olympic Athletes.

Netherlands at the Summer Olympics 
*Purple border color indicates tournament was held in the Netherlands.

Netherlands at the Winter Olympics

Medals by summer sport

Medals by winter sport

List of medalists

Summer Olympics

Winter Olympics

Most successful Dutch competitors

Individual athletes

Team performances

Medals by sport

Sailing

See also 
 List of flag bearers for the Netherlands at the Olympics
 Netherlands at the Paralympics

Notes 

 Feasibility Studies For Boston 2020, Netherlands 2028 Summer Games 
 Not counting gold medal in Men's coxed pair events at the 1900 Games, this medal was awarded to a Mixed team (ZZX). Hermanus Brockmann in coxed pairs rowing competition was the coxswain for the semifinals, but not for the finals. The name of the French boy the Dutch team employed as a coxswain for the final is unknown.  The medal therefore was not awarded to the Netherlands, but to a Mixed team (ZZX).

External links